The Academia Mexicana de Genealogía y Heráldica (Mexican Academy of Genealogy and Heraldry) is a cultural institution based in Mexico City, Mexico. It has a unique position in being an independent, privately funded institution led by eminent historians, enthusiasts in the Genealogical and Heraldic Sciences whose purpose is to promote the creation, enjoyment and appreciation of the after mentioned sciences through research, essays, colloquiums, courses, exhibitions, education and debate.

History
The Academia Mexicana de Genealogía y Heráldica has its origin in the Academia Hispanoamericana de Genealogía y Herádica, established in Mexico City in 1921 by José Ignacio Dávila Garibi; with a difficult beginning, the institution had to be reorganized in 1941 but without much success.

Finally, on 15 May 1943 the Academia Mexicana de Genealogía y Heráldica was founded by José Ignacio Dávila Garibi with a mission to promote the studies on Genealogy and Heraldry through research, education and exhibition. The motive in founding the Academy was twofold: to raise the professional status of the researcher by establishing a sound system of training and expert judgment in the sciences of Genealogy and Heraldry attaining an appropriate standard of excellence, and to publish some essays in its main publication: Memorias. Behind this concept was the desire to encourage appreciation and interest in the already mentioned sciences.

Fashionable taste in 20th century's fourth decade, Mexico centered on the study of the traditional families and their influence through time. With the passing of time, the Academia Mexicana de Genealogía y Heráldica came to dominate the genealogical and heraldic scene since the second half of the 20th century.

It's the only Mexican institution in the sciences of Genealogy and Heraldry which belongs to the Confédération Internationale de Généalogie et d'Héraldique and to the Confederación Iberoamericana de ciencias Genealógica y Heráldica.

Founding members
The founding members were five: José Ignacio Dávila Garibi, President; Guilermo Romo Célis, Secretary General; Gonzalo Torres Martínez, Treasurer; Luis García Remus and Manuel Septién y Septién, and allowed for a total membership of 24 Numbered Academicians and some others non-numbered, correspondent and honorary members. The institution was reorganized in 1957.

Presidents

Other posts

Premio Academia Mexicana de Genealogía y Heráldica

The Premio Academia Mexicana de Genealogía y Heráldica is a prize established in 1985 by Guillermo Romo Célis (1912–1988) as a recognition of excellence in achievements on published studies on genealogy and heraldry, and it's given during the celebration of the International Congress of Genealogical and Heraldic Sciences.

Among others, this prize has been granted to:

Genealogical records
This institution, in collaboration with the Church of Jesus Christ of Latter-day Saints had contributed during the microfilming process of the main Mexican Catholic Church records (1953–71), archiving the amount of 72,000 film rolls (86 million pages). Thanks to a contract among the aforementioned institutions, a whole copy of these microfilms were kept in possession of the Academia Mexicana de Genealogía y Heráldica; nowadays such copies are located in the Archivo General de la Nación (Mexico City), and are available for public consultation under the guidelines and regulations of the same institution.

The AMGyH had signed collaboration documents with the historical archives of the Mexican states of Aguascalientes (2006) and Michoacán (2007) to contribute with the digitalization and preservation of their most valuable files.

Colloquia
 (1987) I Coloquio sobre Arte, Religión y Genealogía (Pinacoteca Virreinal de San Diego, Mexico City, 25–27 August). The lectures were presented to general public and were given by:
 –"La Estirpe y Linaje de José María Morelos", by Ignacio Francisco González-Polo y Acosta
 –"La Casa de Echave de Laurcain; los tres pintores Baltasar de Echave (padre, hijo y nieto)", by Dolores Echave de Elguero
 –"Los padres Medina Picazo, los Condes de Medina y Torres y su huella monumental", by Francisco Javier de Castaños y Cañedo
 –"Una dinastía de Pintores Novohispanos, los Juárez y los Rodríguez Juárez, seis pintores en los siglos XVII y XVIII", by Alicia Enríquez de Pinal-Icaza
 –"En torno al retrato dieciochesco de un personaje virreinal, don Francisco Ignacio de Iraeta, del pintor Andrés Islas", by Salvador de Pinal-Icaza y Enríquez
 –"La Benemérita madre María Ignacia de Azlor y Echevers, hija de los Marqueses de San Miguel de Aguayo, fundadora de La Enseñanza", by Virginia Armella de Aspe
 –"Eulogio G. Gillow, Arzobispo de Oaxaca y la Casa Marquesal de Selva Nevada", by Mercedes Meade Esteva de Angulo
 –"Pintoras mexicanas del Siglo XIX", by Leonor Cortina de Pintado
 (1988) I Coloquio Hablemos de Heráldica (Pinacoteca Virreinal de San Diego, Mexico City, 10–18 February). The lectures were presented to general public and were given by:
 –"Heráldica en General, differencias nacionales", by Salvador de Pinal-Icaza y Enríquez
 –"Heráldica Religiosa", by Virginia Armella de Aspe
 –"Originalidad de la Heráldica Carolina en Indias", by Teodoro Amerlinck y Zirión
 –"Escudos de las Entidades Federativas Mexicanas", by Mercedes Meade Esteva de Angulo
 (1997) II Coloquio Hablemos de Heráldica (Pinacoteca Virreinal de San Diego, Mexico City, 11–21 July). This event was organized for the exhibition Blasones Virreinales de Hispanoamérica (see Exhibitions), by Mexico's  Consejo Nacional para la Cultura y las Artes (CONACULTA), through the Instituto Nacional de Bellas Artes y Literatura. The lectures were presented to general public and were given by:
 –"Discurso de apertura de la exposición Blasones Virreinales" by Teodoro Amerlinck y Zirión
 –"Don Isidro Antonio de Icaza y Caparroso" by Salvador de Pinal-Icaza y Enríquez
 –"Dos Virreyes del Ducado de Alburquerque en Nueva España" by Rodrigo-Alonso López-Portillo y Lancaster-Jones
 –"Heráldica de los Virreyes Gálvez" by Isaac Luis Velázquez y Morales
 –"Hasekura Tsunenaga" by José Alberto Said Ramírez Beteta

Courses
 (2001) Heráldica General y Novohispana (Auditorium, Museo del Ex-Convento del Carmen, San Ángel, Mexico City: 5–26 November). The course's intention was to present the general knowledge of the Heraldic Science and its peculiarities in Mexico during the Viceroyalty of New Spain; it was coordinated by Virginia Armella de Aspe, at that time Curator of the Museo del Ex-Convento del Carmen and given to general public by Ricardo-Antonio López-Portillo y Lancaster-Jones and Rodrigo-Alonso López-Portillo y Lancaster-Jones.

Exhibitions
 (1968) Academia Mexicana de Genealogía y Heráldica 1943–1968 (Club de Banqueros de México, Mexico City, 15 May / 15 June)
 (1987–88) Dibujos Heráldicos de Luis León de la Barra  (Pinacoteca Virreinal de San Diego, Mexico City, 2 December / 15 May)
 (1997) Blasones Virreinales Hispanoamericanos by the Argentinian heraldic artist Esther de Soaje Pinto (Pinacoteca Virreinal de San Diego, Mexico City, 11–21 July)

International congresses
Since its establishment, delegates from the Academia Mexicana de Genealogía y Heráldica had attended to many international congresses of Genealogy and Heraldry, among others, the most important are the International Congress of Genealogical and Heraldic Sciences, the Congreso Iberoamericano de las Ciencias Genealógica y Heráldica and the Reunión Americana de Genealogía.

The XVI Reunión Americana de Genealogía
The Academia Mexicana de Genealogía y Heráldica participated along with the Universidad Nacional Autónoma de México (UNAM), through its Instituto de Investigaciones Históricas (Institute of Historic Research), and with the Government of the State of Michoacán (Mexico), in the organization of the XVI Reunión Americana de Genealogía and VI Congreso Iberoamericano de las Ciencias Genealógica y Heráldica; an event that was celebrated in the city of Morelia (Michoacán), on 11–15 October 2010.

Publications

The Academia Mexicana de Genealogía y Heráldica published a series of Memorias through two periods: 8 volumes on the first one (1945–57); having published 17 volumes from 1957 until 2005.

Since January 2010 the Academia Mexicana de Genealogía y Heráldica has started to publish an electronic Newsletter: Boletín-e, it's distributed among the Academy members by e-mail in Pdf format.

List of AMGyHs: past and current
(incomplete list, alphabetical order)

References

Main references

 
 
 
 
 
 
 

History institutes
Cultural heritage of Mexico
Mexican heraldry
Organizations established in 1943
History organizations based in Mexico
Genealogical societies